Mauro Bertarelli (born 15 September 1970) is a retired Italian football striker. He represented Italy's U-21 and U-23 sides at the 1992 UEFA European Under-21 Championship and the 1993 Mediterranean Games.

References

1970 births
Living people
Italian footballers
S.S.D. Jesina Calcio players
A.C. Ancona players
Rimini F.C. 1912 players
U.C. Sampdoria players
Empoli F.C. players
Ravenna F.C. players
Association football forwards
Serie A players
Italy under-21 international footballers
Competitors at the 1993 Mediterranean Games
Mediterranean Games competitors for Italy